Pseudoatta is a genus of ant in the subfamily Myrmicinae. It contains the single species Pseudoatta argentina,  native to Argentina.

References

External links

Myrmicinae
Endemic fauna of Argentina
Hymenoptera of South America
Insects described in 1916
Monotypic ant genera
Taxonomy articles created by Polbot